Hypeugoa is a monotypic moth genus in the subfamily Arctiinae. Its single species, Hypeugoa flavogrisea, is found in western China. Both the genus and species were first described by John Henry Leech in 1899.

References

External links

Lithosiini
Monotypic moth genera
Moths of Asia